Pak Sha Chau is an island of Hong Kong. Administratively, it is part of the Sai Kung District. Additionally it is part of the Kiu Tsui Country Park.

The island is connected to a smaller island, Siu Tsan Chau, by a tombolo.

See also

 List of islands and peninsulas of Hong Kong
 Port Shelter, the water body that surrounding the island

Uninhabited islands of Hong Kong
Islands of Hong Kong